The 1814 United States Senate election in Pennsylvania was held on December 10, 1814. Incumbent Jonathan Roberts was elected by the Pennsylvania General Assembly to the United States Senate.

Background
After the resignation of Democratic-Republican Sen. Michael Leib in February 1814, fellow Democratic-Republican Jonathan Roberts was elected by the General Assembly in a special election to fill the vacancy and serve out the term ending on March 4, 1815. This election, held in December 1814, was the regularly scheduled election to elect a Senator to serve the term beginning upon the expiration of the previous term.

Results
The Pennsylvania General Assembly, consisting of the House of Representatives and the Senate, convened on December 10, 1814, to elect a Senator to serve the term beginning on March 4, 1815. The results of the vote of both houses combined are as follows:

|-
|-bgcolor="#EEEEEE"
| colspan="3" align="right" | Totals
| align="right" | 126
| align="right" | 100.00%
|}

See also 
 United States Senate elections, 1814 and 1815

References

External links
Pennsylvania Election Statistics: 1682-2006 from the Wilkes University Election Statistics Project

1814
Pennsylvania
United States Senate